Mbita Constituency is an electoral constituency in Kenya. It is one of eight constituencies in Homa Bay County. It was one of two constituencies in the former Suba District.

Members of Parliament

Wards

References 

Constituencies in Homa Bay County
Constituencies in Nyanza Province